Naru may refer to:

Fiction
 Naru Narusegawa, a character in the Love Hina series
 Naaru, a race of energy beings in World of Warcraft
 Kazuya Shibuya, a character in the Ghost Hunt series
 Naru Osaka, a character from the Japanese manga series Sailor Moon
 Naru (Predator), the protagonist of the 2022 film Prey

People
, Japanese badminton player
, Japanese artist

Places
 Naru, Fars, a village in Fars Province, Iran
 Naru, Nagasaki, or Gotō, the city that includes Naru Island, Japan
 Naru Island (Japan), one of the Goto Islands in Japan
 Naru Island (Solomon Islands), one of the Solomon Islands

See also
 Ab Naru (disambiguation)
 Narus (disambiguation)
 Nauru, an island nation in the South Pacific
 

Japanese feminine given names